The National Premier Leagues Victoria 3, commonly referred to as NPL Victoria 3, is a semi-professional soccer league in Victoria, Australia. The league is the third-highest in the Victorian league system, behind NPL Victoria and NPL Victoria 2, and forms part of the fourth tier of the overall Australian pyramid.

The league was created from the bottom halves of NPL Victoria 2 East and West, when the league was reorganised from two geographic conferences to two separate vertical NPL divisions.

The competition is administered by Football Victoria, the governing body of the sport in the state. Due to start 2020 season NPL Victoria 3 has been cancelled due to the COVID-19 pandemic.

Format
The NPL Victoria 3 is contested by 12 teams. Each team plays home and away against teams against all other teams in the league for a total of 22 fixtures per team each season. The winner of each conference gains automatic promotion to the NPL Victoria 2 while 2nd in both conferences will play off in a final; the winner to play the third last team in the NPL Victoria for entry into the top flight.

Due to the entry of Western United into the A-League, NPL Victoria competition rules contain a provision allowing the new professional side to place a development team directly into NPL Victoria 3. This will occur in 2021, so the league would compete for that season with 13 teams, with promotion/relegation rules for State League 1 temporarily modified to revert the structure back to twelve clubs per league.

Current clubs (2023)
After the cancellation of both the 2020 season and the 2021 season due to the COVID-19 pandemic, it was decided that no promotion/relegation would apply for the following season.

Western United FC Youth joined the league as a new team in the 2021 season. 

The following clubs will take part in the 2023 NPL Victoria 3 season:

History
In 2018, pressures from member clubs and a desire to re-evaluate league structure and organisation lead Football Victoria to commission a report into how the NPL Victoria leagues could be re-worked. Among a series of recommendations on improvements to the youth structure, the report recommended that NPL Victoria 2 - then a two-conference division with ten teams each in an east-west split, contesting 28 fixtures each per season - should be reformed with NPL Victoria 2 turned into a single division of 12 teams and a new 12-team division - NPL Victoria 3 - created.

The proposed changes were agreed, and to enact the split the top six teams of each NPL Victoria 2 conference in the 2019 season were given places in the 2020 Victoria 2 competition, with the bottom four of the two conferences all relegated to Victoria 3. Four additional teams were promoted from Victorian State League 1 to make up the numbers. Among the sides moved to NPL Victoria 3 were the NPL development sides of A-League duo Melbourne City and Melbourne Victory.

Past winners

References

Notes

External links
 Football Victoria website

Soccer leagues in Victoria (Australia)
Recurring sporting events established in 2020
2020 establishments in Australia
Sports leagues established in 2020
Professional sports leagues in Australia
Fourth level football leagues in Asia